Visintini is a surname. Notable people with the surname include:

Jorge Visintini (born 1988), Argentine footballer
Licio Visintini (1915–1942), Italian naval officer
Mario Visintini (1913–1941), Italian military aircraft pilot

Italian-language surnames